Downtown Albemarle Historic District is a national historic district located at Albemarle, Stanly County, North Carolina. The district encompasses 20 contributing buildings in the central business district of Albemarle.  They were built between about 1898 and 1950 and include notable examples of Early Commercial architecture.  Located in the district and separately listed is the Starnes Opera House.  Other notable buildings include the Central Lunch (1929-1930, c. 1950), Farmers Hardware and General Store (1898), King Block I (1898), King Block II (1898), King Block III (1898), J. C. Parker Building (1898), King Building (1898), Hall's Pharmacy Building (c. 1908), Efird Dry Goods Store (1903), The Enterprise Steam Print Building (1922), "The Big Store" (1898), Fitzgerald Building (1927), and Morgan Furniture Building (1924).

It was added to the National Register of Historic Places in 2002.

References

Commercial buildings on the National Register of Historic Places in North Carolina
Historic districts on the National Register of Historic Places in North Carolina
Buildings and structures in Stanly County, North Carolina
National Register of Historic Places in Stanly County, North Carolina